The men's team table tennis - Class 3 tournament at the 2012 Summer Paralympics in London is taking place from 5 September to 7 September 2012 at ExCeL Exhibition Centre. Classes 1-5 are for athletes with a physical impairment that affects their legs, and who compete in a sitting position. The lower the number, the greater the impact the impairment has on an athlete's ability to compete.

Bracket

Results

Quarter-finals

Semi-finals

Finals
Gold medal match

Bronze medal match

References

MT03